Asipeli Fine (born 26 October 1992) is a Tonga international rugby league footballer who plays for the Redcliffe Dolphins in the Queensland Cup. He previously played for the Wests Tigers and Canterbury-Bankstown Bulldogs.

Background
Fine was born in Sydney, New South Wales, Australia. He attended Waverley College. He played his junior rugby league for the Mascot Jets, before being signed by the Sydney Roosters.

Playing career

Early career
From 2009 to 2012, Fine played for the Sydney Roosters' NYC team. In 2012, he joined the Wests Tigers NYC team mid-season, before graduating to their New South Wales Cup team in 2013.

2014
On 2 May, Fine was 18th man for Tonga against Samoa. On 19 August, he re-signed with the Tigers on a 2-year contract. Less than a fortnight later, he made his NRL debut for the Tigers against the Canberra Raiders. He finished his debut season in the NRL having played in 2 games.

2015
In September 2015, Fine was named in Tonga's 58-man train-on squad for their match against the Cook Islands.

2016
In Round 9 of the 2016 NRL season, Fine made a return to the Tigers' NRL side after not playing a first-grade game in 2015. On 2 June, he joined the Canterbury-Bankstown Bulldogs mid-season on a contract to the end of 2018. He made his Bulldogs debut in Round 16 against the Brisbane Broncos.

2018
In August 2018, it was announced by Canterbury that Fine was one of the players being released at seasons end.  In September 2018, Canterbury held mad monday celebrations at The Harbour View Hotel in Sydney's CBD.  Later in the evening, photographs provided by the media showed Canterbury players being heavily intoxicated, stripping naked and vomiting in the street.  Fine was handed a $25,000 fine (including $10,000 suspended) by Canterbury after nude images of the player appeared in the media.  Fine was also handed a notice to attend court for wilful and obscene exposure.

Following the mad monday incident, Fine suffered a dislocated hip and fractured pelvis while playing for Canterbury's Intrust Super Premiership NSW side.  On 1 December, Fine was released by Canterbury after not being offered a new contract for the 2019 season.

2019
In 2019, Fine joined Queensland Cup side Redcliffe.

References

External links

Canterbury Bulldogs profile
NRL profile
2016 Wests Tigers profile

1992 births
Living people
Australian sportspeople of Tongan descent
Australian rugby league players
Balmain Ryde-Eastwood Tigers players
Canterbury-Bankstown Bulldogs players
Redcliffe Dolphins players
Rugby league centres
Rugby league players from Sydney
Rugby league second-rows
Rugby league wingers
Tonga national rugby league team players
Wests Tigers NSW Cup players
Wests Tigers players